James Madden (born 15 November 1999) is an Ireland-born professional Australian rules football (AFL) player who plays for the Brisbane Lions in the Australian Football League.  Madden is a former Gaelic footballer, who played for the Ballyboden St Enda's club and also the Dublin county team in the All-Ireland Minor Football Championship. Madden kicked his first AFL goal in the Lions' win in a match against Richmond on 21 May 2021.

Statistics
Updated to the end of the 2022 season.

|-
| 2021 ||  || 42
| 9 || 1 || 0 || 49 || 50 || 99 || 25 || 16 || 0.1 || 0.0 || 5.4 || 5.6 || 11.0 || 2.8 || 1.8
|-
| 2022 ||  || 14
| 2 || 0 || 0 || 10 || 4 || 14 || 7 || 3 || 0.0 || 0.0 || 5.0 || 2.0 || 7.0 || 3.5 || 1.5
|- class=sortbottom
! colspan=3 | Career
! 11 !! 1 !! 0 !! 59 !! 54 !! 113 !! 32 !! 19 !! 0.1 !! 0.0 !! 5.4 !! 4.9 !! 10.3 !! 2.9 !! 1.7
|}

References

External links

Living people
1999 births
Brisbane Lions players
Irish players of Australian rules football
Gaelic footballers who switched code
Irish expatriate sportspeople in Australia